Brainard may refer to:

 99928 Brainard, asteroid within Sol system

Places
 Brainard, California: 
 Modern Brainard, California
 Early name of Bracut, California
 Hartford–Brainard Airport (in Hartford, Connecticut area), for small aircraft
 Brainard, Nebraska

Other uses
 Brainard (surname)

See also
 Brainerd (disambiguation)